The traditional Chinese calendar (also known as the Nongli Calendar, Jiuli Calendar , Laoli Calendar  )  is a lunisolar calendar which identifies years, months, and days according to astronomical phenomena. In China, it is defined by the Chinese national standard GB/T 33661-2017, "Calculation and Promulgation of the Chinese Calendar", issued by the Standardization Administration of China on May 12, 2017.

Although modern-day China uses the Gregorian calendar, the traditional Chinese calendar governs holidays, such as the Chinese New Year and Lantern Festival, in both China and overseas Chinese communities. It also provides the traditional Chinese nomenclature of dates within a year which people use to select auspicious days for weddings, funerals, moving or starting a business. The evening state-run news program Xinwen Lianbo in the P.R.C. continues to announce the months and dates in both the Gregorian and the traditional lunisolar calendar.

Like Chinese characters, variants of Chinese calendar were used in different parts of the Sinosphere throughout history. Korea, Vietnam, and the Ryukyu Islands adopted the Chinese calendar, and evolved it into Korean, Vietnamese, and Ryukyuan calendars, with the main difference from the Chinese calendar being the use of different meridians due to geography, which leads to some astronomical events — and calendar events based on them — falling on different dates. The traditional Japanese calendar was also derived from the Chinese calendar (based on a Japanese meridian), but Japan abolished its official use in 1873 after Meiji Restoration reforms. Calendars in Mongolia and Tibet have absorbed elements of the traditional Chinese calendar but are not direct descendants of it.

Days begin and end at midnight, and months begin on the day of the new moon. Years start on the second (or third) new moon after the winter solstice. Solar terms govern the beginning, middle, and end of each month. A sexagenary cycle, comprising stems and branches, is used as identification alongside each year and month; including intercalary months or leap months. Months are also annotated as either long ( for months with 30 days) or short ( for months with 29 days).

History

Solar calendars

The traditional Chinese calendar was developed between 771 and 476 BCE, during the Spring and Autumn period of the Eastern Zhou dynasty. Solar calendars were used before the Zhou dynasty period.

One version of the solar calendar is the five-elements calendar, which derives from the Wu Xing. A 365-day year was divided into five phases of 73 days, with each phase corresponding to a Day 1 Wu Xing element. A phase began with a governing-element day, followed by six 12-day weeks. Each phase consisted of two three-week months, making each year ten months long. Years began on a jiǎzǐ day (and a 72-day wood phase), followed by a bǐngzǐ day and a 72-day fire phase; a wùzǐ day and a 72-day earth phase; a gēngzǐ day and a 72-day metal phase, and a rénzǐ day followed by a water phase. Other days were tracked using the Yellow River Map (He Tu).

Another version is a four-quarters calendar (or ). The weeks were ten days long, with one month consisting of three weeks. A year had 12 months, with a ten-day week intercalated in summer as needed to keep up with the tropical year. The 10 Heavenly Stems and 12 Earthly Branches were used to mark days.

A third version is the balanced calendar. A year was 365.25 days, and a month was 29.5 days. After every 16th month, a half-month was intercalated. According to oracle bone records, the Shang dynasty calendar ( BCE) was a balanced calendar with 12 to 14 months in a year; the month after the winter solstice was Zhēngyuè.

Lunisolar calendars
The first lunisolar calendar was the Zhou calendar, introduced under the Zhou dynasty. This calendar sets the beginning of the year at the day of the new moon before the winter solstice.

Several competing lunisolar calendars were also introduced, especially by states fighting Zhou control during the Warring States period. The state of Lu issued its own Lu calendar(). Jin issued the Xia calendar with a year beginning on the day of the new moon nearest the March equinox. Qin issued the Zhuanxu calendar, with a year beginning on the day of the new moon nearest the winter solstice. Song's Yin calendar began its year on the day of the new moon after the winter solstice.

These calendars are known as the six ancient calendars, or quarter-remainder calendars,, since all calculate a year as  days long. Months begin on the day of the new moon, and a year has 12 or 13 months. Intercalary months (a 13th month) are added to the end of the year. The Qiang and Dai calendars are modern versions of the Zhuanxu calendar, used by mountain peoples.

Qin and early Han dynasties
After Qin Shi Huang unified China under the Qin dynasty in 221 BCE, the Qin calendar was introduced. It followed most of the rules governing the Zhuanxu calendar, but the month order was that of the Xia calendar; the year began with month 10 and ended with month 9, analogous to a Gregorian calendar beginning in October and ending in September. The intercalary month, known as the second Jiǔyuè, was placed at the end of the year. The Qin calendar was used going into the Han dynasty.

Han-Ming dynasties and Taichu calendar
Emperor Wu of Han  introduced reforms halfway through his reign. His Taichu Calendar defined a solar year as  days, and the lunar month had  days. 
Since  the 19 years cycle used for the 7 additional months was taken as an exact one, and not as an approximation.

This calendar introduced the 24 solar terms, dividing the year into 24 equal parts. Solar terms were paired, with the 12 combined periods known as climate terms. 

The Taichu calendar established a framework for traditional calendars, with later calendars adding to the basic formula. The Dàmíng Calendar, created in the Liang dynasty by Zu Chongzhi, introduced the equinoxes. The use of syzygy to determine the lunar month was first described in the Tang dynasty Wùyín Yuán Calendar. The Yuan dynasty Shòushí calendar used spherical trigonometry to find the length of the tropical year. The calendar had a 365.2425-day year, identical to the Gregorian calendar.

Modern calendars 
Although the Chinese calendar lost its place as the country's official calendar at the beginning of the 20th century, its use has continued. The Republic of China Calendar published by the Beiyang government of the Republic of China still listed the dates of the Chinese calendar in addition to the Gregorian calendar. In 1929, the Nationalist government tried to ban the traditional Chinese calendar. The Kuómín Calendar published by the government no longer listed the dates of the Chinese calendar. However, Chinese people were used to the traditional calendar and many traditional customs were based on the Chinese calendar. The ban failed and was lifted in 1934. The latest Chinese calendar was "New Edition of Wànniánlì, revised edition", edited by Beijing Purple Mountain Observatory, People's Republic of China.

Shíxiàn calendar 

During the late Ming dynasty, the Chinese Emperor appointed Xu Guangqi in 1629 to be the leader of the ShiXian calendar reform. Assisted by Jesuits, he translated Western astronomical works and introduced new concepts, such as those of Nicolaus Copernicus, Johannes Kepler, Galileo Galilei, and Tycho Brahe; however, the new calendar was not released before the end of the dynasty. In the early Qing dynasty, Johann Adam Schall von Bell submitted the calendar which was edited by the lead of Xu Guangqi to the Shunzhi Emperor. The Qing government issued it as the Shíxiàn (seasonal) calendar. In this calendar, the solar terms are 15° each along the ecliptic and it can be used as a solar calendar. However, the length of the climate term near the perihelion is less than 30 days and there may be two mid-climate terms. The Shíxiàn calendar changed the mid-climate-term rule to "decide the month in sequence, except the intercalary month." The present traditional calendar follows the Shíxiàn calendar, except:
 The baseline is Chinese Standard Time, rather than Beijing local time.
 (Modern) astronomical data, rather than mathematical calculations, is used.

Proposals
To optimize the Chinese calendar, astronomers have proposed a number of changes. Gao Pingzi (1888–1970), a Chinese astronomer who co-founded the Purple Mountain Observatory, proposed that month numbers be calculated before the new moon and solar terms to be rounded to the day. Since the intercalary month is determined by the first month without a mid-climate and the mid-climate time varies by time zone, countries that adopted the calendar but calculate with their own time could vary from the time in China.

Outlying areas 
Calendars of ethnic groups in mountains and plateaus of southwestern China and grasslands of northern China are based on their phenology and algorithms of traditional calendars of different periods, particularly the Tang and pre-Qin dynasties.

Structure

Elements 
The traditional Chinese calendar's elements are:
 Day, from one midnight to the next
 Month, the time from one new moon to the next. These synodic months are about  days long. 
 Date, when a day occurs in the month. Days are numbered in sequence from 1 to 29 (or 30).
 Year, time of one revolution of Earth around the sun. It is measured from the first day of spring (lunisolar year) or the winter solstice (solar year). A year is about  days.
 Zodiac,  year, or 30° on the ecliptic. A zodiac is about  days.
Solar term,  year, or 15° on the ecliptic. A solar term is about  days. 
 Calendar month, when a month occurs within a year. Some months may be repeated.
 Calendar year, when it is agreed that one year ends and another begins. The year begins on the first day of spring, defined as the second (sometimes third) new moon after the winter solstice. A calendar year is 353–355 or 383–385 days long.

The Chinese calendar is lunisolar, similar to the Hindu, Hebrew and ancient Babylonian calendars.

Features 
The movements of the Sun, Moon, Mercury, Venus, Mars, Jupiter and Saturn (known as the seven luminaries) are the references for calendar calculations. 
 The distance between Mercury and the sun is less than 30° (the sun's height at chénshí:, 8:00 to 10:00 am), so Mercury was sometimes called the "chen star"; it is more commonly known as the "water star".
 Venus appears at dawn and dusk and is known as the "bright star" or "long star".
 Mars looks like fire and occurs irregularly, and is known as the "fire star" ( or ). Mars is the punisher in Chinese mythology. When Mars is near Antares, it is a bad omen and can forecast an emperor's death or a chancellor's removal.
 Jupiter's revolution period is 11.86 years, so Jupiter is called the "age star"; 30° of Jupiter's revolution is about a year on earth.
 Saturn's revolution period is about 28 years. Known as the "guard star", Saturn guards one of the 28 Mansions every year.

The Big Dipper is the celestial compass, and its handle's direction determines the season and month.
The stars are divided into Three Enclosures and 28 Mansions according to their location in the sky relative to Ursa Minor, at the center. Each mansion is named with a character describing the shape of its principal asterism. The Three Enclosures are Purple Forbidden,, Supreme Palace, and Heavenly Market. The moon moves through about one lunar mansion per day, so the 28 mansions were also used to count days. In the Tang dynasty, Yuan Tiangang matched the 28 mansions, seven luminaries and yearly animal signs to yield combinations such as "horn-wood-flood dragon".

Codes 
Several coding systems are used to avoid ambiguity. The Heavenly Stems is a decimal system. The Earthly Branches, a duodecimal system, mark dual hours ( or ) and climatic terms. The 12 characters progress from the first day with the same branch as the month (first Yín day of Zhēngyuè; first Mǎo day of Èryuè), and count the days of the month.

The stem-branches is a sexagesimal system. The Heavenly Stems and Earthly Branches make up 60 stem-branches. The stem branches mark days and years. The five Wu Xing elements are assigned to each stem, branch, or stem branch.

Day

China has used the Western hour-minute-second system to divide the day since the Qing dynasty. Several era-dependent systems had been in use; systems using multiples of twelve and ten were popular, since they could be easily counted and aligned with the Heavenly Stems and Earthly Branches.

Week

As early as the Bronze-Age Xia dynasty, days were grouped into nine- or ten-day weeks known as xún. Months consisted of three xún. The first 10 days were the early xún, the middle 10 the mid xún, and the last nine (or 10) days were the late xún. In Korea, they were known as sun.

The structure of xún led to public holidays every five or ten days. Officials of the Han dynasty were legally required to rest every five days (twice a xún, or 5–6 times a month). The name of these breaks became huan ("wash").

Grouping days into sets of ten is still used today in referring to specific natural events. "Three Fu", a 29–30-day period which is the hottest of the year, reflects its three-xún length. After the winter solstice, nine sets of nine days were counted to calculate the end of winter.

The seven-day week was adopted from the Hellenistic system by the 4th century CE, although its source is unclear. It was again transmitted to China in the 8th century by Manichaeans via Kangju (a Central Asian kingdom near Samarkand), and is the most-used system in modern China.

Month
Months are defined by the time between new moons, which averages approximately  days. There is no specified length of any particular Chinese month, so the first month could have 29 days (short month) in some years and 30 days (long month) in other years.

A 12-month-year using this system has 354 days, which would drift significantly from the tropical year. To fix this, traditional Chinese years have a 13-month year approximately once every three years. The 13-month version has the same long and short months alternating, but adds a 30-day leap month at the end of the year. Years with 12 months are called common years, and 13-month years are known as long years.

Although most of the above rules were used until the Tang dynasty, different eras used different systems to keep lunar and solar years aligned. The synodic month of the Taichu calendar was  days long. The 7th-century, Tang-dynasty Wùyín Yuán Calendar was the first to determine month length by synodic month instead of the cycling method. Since then, month lengths have primarily been determined by observation and prediction.

The days of the month are always written with two characters and numbered beginning with 1. Days one to 10 are written with the day's numeral, preceded by the character Chū; Chūyī is the first day of the month, and Chūshí the 10th. Days 11 to 20 are written as regular Chinese numerals; Shíwǔ is the 15th day of the month, and Èrshí the 20th. Days 21 to 29 are written with the character Niàn before the characters one through nine; Niànsān, for example, is the 23rd day of the month. Day 30 (when applicable) is written as the numeral Sānshí.

History books use days of the month numbered with the 60 stem-branches: 

Because astronomical observation determines month length, dates on the calendar correspond to moon phases. The first day of each month is the new moon. On the seventh or eighth day of each month, the first-quarter moon is visible in the afternoon and early evening. On the 15th or 16th day of each month, the full moon is visible all night. On the 22nd or 23rd day of each month, the last-quarter moon is visible late at night and in the morning.

Since the beginning of the month is determined by when the new moon occurs, other countries using this calendar use their own time standards to calculate it; this results in deviations. The first new moon in 1968 was at 16:29 UTC on 29 January. Since North Vietnam used UTC+07:00 to calculate their Vietnamese calendar and South Vietnam used UTC+08:00 (Beijing time) to calculate theirs, North Vietnam began the Tết holiday at 29 January at 23:29 while South Vietnam began it on 30 January at 00:15. The time difference allowed asynchronous attacks in the Tet Offensive.

Names of months 
Lunar months were originally named according to natural phenomena. Current naming conventions use numbers as the month names. Every month is also associated with one of the twelve Earthly Branches.

Gregorian dates are approximate and should be used with caution. Many years have intercalary months.

Chinese lunar date conventions

Though the numbered month names are often used for the corresponding month number in the Gregorian calendar, it is important to realize that the numbered month names are not interchangeable with the Gregorian months when talking about lunar dates.

Incorrect: The Dragon Boat Festival falls on 5 May in the Lunar Calendar, whereas the Double Ninth Festival, Lantern Festival, and Qixi Festival fall on 9 September, 15 January, and 7 July in the Lunar Calendar, respectively.
Correct: The Dragon Boat Festival falls on Wǔyuè 5th (or, 5th day of the fifth month) in the Lunar Calendar, whereas the Double Ninth Festival, Lantern Festival and Qixi Festival fall on Jiǔyuè 9th (or, 9th day of the ninth month), Zhēngyuè 15th (or, 15th day of the first month) and Qīyuè 7th (or, 7th day of the seventh month) in the Lunar Calendar, respectively.
Alternate Chinese Zodiac correction: The Dragon Boat Festival falls on Horse Month 5th in the Lunar Calendar, whereas the Double Ninth Festival, Lantern Festival and Qixi Festival fall on Dog Month 9th, Tiger Month 15th and Monkey Month 7th in the Lunar Calendar, respectively.

One may identify the heavenly stem and earthly branch corresponding to a particular day in the month, and those corresponding to its month, and those to its year, to determine the Four Pillars of Destiny associated with it, for which the Tung Shing, also referred to as the Chinese Almanac of the year, or the Huangli, and containing the essential information concerning Chinese astrology, is the most convenient publication to consult. Days rotate through a sexagenary cycle marked by coordination between heavenly stems and earthly branches, hence the referral to the Four Pillars of Destiny as, "Bazi", or "Birth Time Eight Characters", with each pillar consisting of a character for its corresponding heavenly stem, and another for its earthly branch. Since Huangli days are sexagenaric, their order is quite independent of their numeric order in each month, and of their numeric order within a week (referred to as True Animals in relation to the Chinese zodiac). Therefore, it does require painstaking calculation for one to arrive at the Four Pillars of Destiny of a particular given date, which rarely outpaces the convenience of simply consulting the Huangli by looking up its Gregorian date.

Solar term

The solar year, the time between winter solstices, is divided into 24 solar terms known as jié qì (節氣). Each term is a 15° portion of the ecliptic. These solar terms mark both Western and Chinese seasons, as well as equinoxes, solstices, and other Chinese events. The solar terms qīng míng (清明) on 5 April and dōng zhì (冬至) on 22 December are both celebrated events in China.

Solar year 
The calendar solar year, known as the suì, begins on the December solstice and proceeds through the 24 solar terms. Since the speed of the Sun's apparent motion in the elliptical is variable, the time between major solar terms is not fixed. This variation in time between major solar terms results in different solar year lengths. There are generally 11 or 12 complete months, plus two incomplete months around the winter solstice, in a solar year. The complete months are numbered from 0 to 10, and the incomplete months are considered the 11th month. If there are 12 complete months in the solar year, it is known as a leap solar year, or leap suì.

Due to the inconsistencies in the length of the solar year, different versions of the traditional calendar might have different average solar year lengths. For example, one solar year of the 1st century BCE Tàichū calendar is  (365.25016) days. A solar year of the 13th-century Shòushí calendar is  (365.2425) days, identical to the Gregorian calendar. The additional .00766 day from the Tàichū calendar leads to a one-day shift every 130.5 years.

Pairs of solar terms are climate terms, or solar months. The first solar term is "pre-climate", and the second is "mid-climate".

If there are 12 complete months within a solar year, the first month without a mid-climate is the leap, or intercalary, month. In other words, the first month that does not include a major solar term is the leap month. Leap months are numbered with rùn , the character for "intercalary", plus the name of the month they follow. In 2017, the intercalary month after month six was called Rùn Liùyuè, or "intercalary sixth month" and written as 6i or 6+. The next intercalary month (in 2020, after month four) will be called Rùn Sìyuè and written 4i or 4+.

Lunisolar year
The lunisolar year begins with the first spring month, Zhēngyuè, and ends with the last winter month, Làyuè. All other months are named for their number in the month order.

Years were traditionally numbered by the reign in ancient China, but this was abolished after founding the People's Republic of China in 1949.

The Tang dynasty used the Earthly Branches to mark the months from December 761 to May 762. Over this period, the year began with the winter solstice.

Age reckoning 

In China, a person's official age is based on the Gregorian calendar. For traditional use, age is based on the Chinese Sui calendar. A child is considered one year old a hundred days after birth (9 months gestation plus 3 months). After each Chinese New Year, one year is added to their traditional age. Their age therefore is the number of Chinese years which have passed. Due to the potential for confusion, the age of infants is often given in months instead of years.

After the Gregorian calendar was introduced in China, the Chinese traditional-age was referred to as the "nominal age" and the Gregorian age was known as the "real age".

Year-numbering systems

Eras

Ancient China numbered years from an emperor's ascension to the throne or his declaration of a new era name. The first recorded reign title was Jiànyuán, from 140 BCE; the last reign title was Xuāntǒng, from 1908 CE. The era system was abolished in 1912, after which the current or Republican era was used.

Stem-branches
The 60 stem-branches have been used to mark the date since the Shang dynasty (1600–1046 BC). Astrologers knew that the orbital period of Jupiter is about 12×361 = 4332 days, which they divided period into 12 years of 361 days each. The stem-branches system solved the era system's problem of unequal reign lengths.

Continuous numbering
Nomenclature similar to that of the Christian era has occasionally been used:

No reference date is universally accepted. The most popular is the Gregorian calendar.

During the 17th century, the Jesuits tried to determine the epochal year of the Han calendar. In his Sinicae historiae decas prima (published in Munich in 1658), Martino Martini (1614–1661) dated the Yellow Emperor's ascension at 2697 BCE and began the Chinese calendar with the reign of Fuxi (which, according to Martini, began in 2952 BCE).
Philippe Couplet's 1686 Chronological table of Chinese monarchs (Tabula chronologica monarchiae sinicae) gave the same date for the Yellow Emperor. The Jesuits' dates provoked interest in Europe, where they were used for comparison with Biblical chronology. Modern Chinese chronology has generally accepted Martini's dates, except that it usually places the reign of the Yellow Emperor at 2698 BCE and omits his predecessors Fuxi and Shennong as "too legendary to include".

Publications began using the estimated birth date of the Yellow Emperor as the first year of the Han calendar in 1903, with newspapers and magazines proposing different dates. Jiangsu province counted 1905 as the year 4396 (using a year 1 of 2491 BCE, and implying that  CE is ), and the newspaper Ming Pao reckoned 1905 as 4603 (using a year 1 of 2698 BCE, and implying that  CE is ). Liu Shipei (1884–1919) created the Yellow Emperor Calendar, with year 1 as the birth of the emperor (which he determined as 2711 BCE, implying that  CE is ). There is no evidence that this calendar was used before the 20th century. Liu calculated that the 1900 international expedition sent by the Eight-Nation Alliance to suppress the Boxer Rebellion entered Beijing in the 4611th year of the Yellow Emperor.

Tauists later adopted Yellow Emperor Calendar and named it Tau Calendar.

On 2 January 1912, Sun Yat-sen announced changes to the official calendar and era. 1 January was 14 Shíyīyuè 4609 Huángdì year, assuming a year 1 of 2698 BCE, making  CE year . Many overseas Chinese communities like San Francisco's Chinatown adopted the change.

Chinese New Year 

The date of the Chinese New Year accords with the patterns of the lunisolar calendar and hence is variable from year to year. However, two general rules govern the date. Firstly, Chinese New Year transpires on the second new moon following the December solstice. If there is a leap month after the eleventh or twelfth month, then Chinese New Year falls on the third new moon after the December solstice. Alternately, Chinese New Year will fall on the new moon that is closest to lì chūn, or the solar term that begins spring (typically falls on 4 February). However, this rule is not as reliable since it can be difficult to determine which new moon is the closest in the case of an early or late Chinese New Year.

It has been found that Chinese New Year moves back by either 10, 11, or 12 days in some years. If it falls before 21 January, then it moves forward in the next year by either 18, 19, or 20 days.

Phenology
The plum-rains season, the rainy season in late spring and early summer, begins on the first bǐng day after Mangzhong and ends on the first wèi day after Xiaoshu. The Three Fu are three periods of hot weather, counted from the first gēng day after the summer solstice. The first fu is 10 days long. The mid-fu is 10 or 20 days long. The last fu is 10 days from the first gēng day after the beginning of autumn. The Shujiu cold days are the 81 days after the winter solstice (divided into nine sets of nine days), and are considered the coldest days of the year. Each nine-day unit is known by its order in the set, followed by "nine".

Common holidays based on the Chinese (lunisolar) calendar
There are several traditional and religious holidays shared by communities throughout the world that use the Chinese (Lunisolar) calendar:

Holidays with the same day and same month
The Chinese New Year (known as the Spring Festival/春節 in China) is on the first day of the first month and was traditionally called the Yuan Dan (元旦) or Zheng Ri (正日). In Vietnam, it is known as Tết Nguyên Đán and in Korea, it is known as 설날. Traditionally it was the most important holiday of the year. It is an official holiday in China, Hong Kong, Macau, Taiwan, Vietnam, Korea, the Philippines, Malaysia, Singapore, Indonesia, and Mauritius. It is also a public holiday in Thailand's Narathiwat, Pattani, Yala, and Satun provinces and is an official public school holiday in New York City.

The Double Third Festival is on the third day of the third month and in Korea is known as 삼짇날 (samjinnal).
  
The Dragon Boat Festival, or the Duanwu Festival (端午節), is on the fifth day of the fifth month and is an official holiday in China, Hong Kong, Macau, and Taiwan. It is also celebrated in Vietnam where it is known as Tết Đoan Ngọ (節端午) and in Korea where it is known as 단오 (端午) (Dano) or 수릿날 (戌衣日/水瀨日) (surinal) (both Hanja are used as they are homonyms).

The Qixi Festival (七夕節) is celebrated in the evening of the seventh day of the seventh month. It is also celebrated in Vietnam where it is known as Thất tịch (七夕) and in Korea where is known as 칠석 (七夕) (chilseok).

The Double Ninth Festival (重陽節) is celebrated on the ninth day of the ninth month. It is also celebrated in Vietnam where it is known as Tết Trùng Cửu (節重九) and in Korea where it is known as 중양절 (jungyangjeol).

Full moon holidays (holidays on the fifteenth day)
The Lantern Festival is celebrated on the fifteenth day of the first month and was traditionally called the Yuan Xiao (元宵) or Shang Yuan Festival (上元節). In Vietnam, it is known as Tết Thượng Nguyên (節上元) and in Korea, it is known as 대보름 (大보름) Daeboreum (or the Great Full Month).

The Zhong Yuan Festival is celebrated on the fifteenth day of the seventh month. In Vietnam, it is celebrated as Tết Trung Nguyên (中元節) or Lễ Vu Lan (禮盂蘭) and in Korea it is known as 백중 (百中/百種) Baekjong or 망혼일 (亡魂日) Manghongil (Deceased Spirit Day) or 중원 (中元) Jungwon.

The Mid-Autumn Festival is celebrated on the fifteenth day of the eighth month. In Vietnam, it is celebrated as Tết Trung Thu (節中秋) and in Korea it is known as 추석 (秋夕) Chuseok.

The Xia Yuan Festival is celebrated on the fifteenth day of the tenth month. In Vietnam, it is celebrated as Tết Hạ Nguyên (節下元).

Celebrations of the twelfth month
The Laba Festival is on the eighth day of the twelfth month. It is the enlightenment day of Sakyamuni Buddha and is celebrated in Korea as 성도재일 (seongdojaeil) and in Vietnam is known as Lễ Vía Phật Thích Ca Thành Đạo.

The Kitchen God Festival is celebrated on the twenty-third day of the twelfth month in northern regions of China and on the twenty-fourth day of the twelfth month in southern regions of China. In Vietnam it is known as Tết Táo Quân (節竈君).

Chinese New Year's Eve is also known as the Chuxi Festival and is celebrated on the evening of the last day of the lunar calendar. It is celebrated wherever the lunar calendar is observed.

Celebrations of solar-term holidays
The Qingming Festival (清明节) is celebrated on the fifteenth day after the Spring Equinox. It is celebrated in Vietnam as Tết Thanh Minh (節清明).

The Dongzhi Festival (冬至) or the Winter Solstice is celebrated as Lễ hội Đông Chí (禮會冬至) in Vietnam and as 동지 (冬至) in Korea.

Religious holidays based on the lunar calendar
East Asian Mahayana, Daoist, and some Cao Dai holidays and/or vegetarian observances are based on the Lunar Calendar.

Celebrations in Japan
Many of the above holidays of the lunar calendar are also celebrated in Japan, but since the Meiji era on the similarly-numbered dates of the Gregorian calendar.

Double celebrations due to intercalary months
In the case when there is a corresponding intercalary month, the holidays may be celebrated twice. For example, in the hypothetical situation in which there is an additional intercalary seventh month, the Zhong Yuan Festival will be celebrated in the seventh month followed by another celebration in the intercalary seventh month.

See also 

 Chinese calendar correspondence table
 Chinese culture
 Chinese numerals
 East Asian age reckoning
 Guo Shoujing, an astronomer tasked with calendar reform during the 13th century
 Horology
 List of festivals in China
 List of festivals in Asia
 Public holidays in China
 Traditional Chinese timekeeping
 Chinese era name
 Metonic cycle of 19 years is used to reckon leap years with intercalary months in the Hebrew and Babylonian calendars

Notes

References

Further reading 
 
 Ho, Kai-Lung (何啟龍) (2006). "The Political Power and the Mongolian Translation of the Chinese Calendar During the Yuan Dynasty". Central Asiatic Journal 50 (1). Harrassowitz Verlag: 57–69. The Political Power and the Mongolian Translation of the Chinese Calendar During the Yuan Dynasty.

External links 
 Calendars
 Chinese months
 Gregorian-Lunar calendar years (1901–2100)
 Chinese calendar and holidays
 Chinese calendar with Auspicious Events
 Chinese Calendar Online

 Calendar conversion
 2000-year Chinese-Western calendar converter From 1 CE to 2100 CE. Useful for historical studies. To use, put the western year 年 month 月day 日in the bottom row and click on 執行.
 Western-Chinese calendar converter

 Rules
 Mathematics of the Chinese Calendar
 The Structure of the Chinese Calendar

 
Calendar
Lunisolar calendars
Specific calendars